Port of Shahid Rajaee is one of the two parts in the port of Bandar Abbas, southern Hormozgan Province, Iran, located in the north shores of the Strait of Hormuz in southern Iran. Shahid Rajaee port is about 14.5 kilometers (nine nautical miles) west-southwest of the Port of Bandar Abbas. 

The area of Shahid Rajaee Port covers about 2400 hectares. The port has the capacity of handling 70 million tons of cargo annually, a figure which includes three million TEUs of containerized cargo. The Port of Shahid Rajaee consists of 23 berths having alongside depth of 15 meters. The overall roofed warehouse covers an area of over 19 hectares of roofed warehouses. The port is featured with 23.5 kilometers of domestic railway tracks.

Marine travelers who enter Iran via Shahid Rajaee Port can receive a visa upon arrival. Shahid Rajaee port is a Special Economic Zone.

Statistics
Shahid Rajaee port is responsible for 85 percent of the total loading and unloading carried out at the Iranian ports. By 2011, Shahid Rajaee port ranked 44th among the 3500 major ports of the world. According to the director-general of Hormozgan Ports and Maritime Organization, container loading for export from the Shahid Rajaee Port from 21 March to 22 August 2021 increased by 28% in comparison with the same period of the previous year.

In late December 2020, six memorandums of understanding were signed between Iranian Ports and Maritime Organization (PMO) and Iranian companies for investing  around $2.38 billion with an additional €800 million for development projects of Shahid Rajaee port's hinterland.

See also
 List of ports in Iran

References

External links

 2020 stats

Container terminals
Ports and harbours of Iran
Special economic zones